Abdul Lateef (died on 6 June 2008) was a Fiji Indian football administrator, lawyer and politician. He served as the President of the Fiji Football Association from 1960–1962 and from 1966 to 1967. He was elected into the Legislative Council in 1966 from the Southern Indian cross-voting constituency on the Alliance ticket.

In 2007 he was made a life member of the Fiji Law Society.

References 

2008 deaths
Fijian Muslims
Alliance Party (Fiji) politicians
Indian members of the Legislative Council of Fiji
Year of birth missing